"If I Have to Stand Alone" is a song by American Hi-NRG and house singer Lonnie Gordon, released in November 1990 as the fourth and last single from her debut album by the same name (1990). Like the other tracks, it was written and produced by English songwriting and record producing trio Stock Aitken & Waterman, and a black-and-white music video was produced to promote the single. In spite of good critical reception, "If I Have to Stand Alone" did not manage to become a hit, remaining at the bottom of the charts in the countries where it was released.

Critical reception
A reviewer from Music & Media commented, "Clearly inspired by 70s disco and bearing the trademark SAW production imprint. A nice little tune with loads of violins and a stampeding drum computer." Nick Robinson from Music Week wrote, "Written, arranged and produced by SAW, this sticks to a winning formula. The Supremes-meets-Gloria Gaynor vocals are coaxed along by that familiar chugging rhythm and vibrant backing". A review published in 2021 on the Pop Rescue site said that "If I Have to Stand Alone" "bursts this 11 track album right open with some wonderful bleeping synths, before instantly screaming Stock/Aitken/Waterman's late 80's synth-pop style", and expressed sadeness about the single failure on the UK single chart.

Chart performance
"If I Have to Stand Alone" debuted at a peak of number 68 on the UK Singles Chart on the chart edition of 17 November 1990, then dropped to number 85 and fell off the chart the next week. In February 1991, it also reached number 147 on the Australian Singles chart where it charted for four weeks.

Track listing
 7" single, UK
"If I Have to Stand Alone"
"If I Have to Stand Alone (Senza Voce)"

 12" single, UK
"If I Have to Stand Alone" (Club Mix)
"If I Have to Stand Alone" (Dub Mix)

 CD maxi, UK
"If I Have to Stand Alone" (12" Version) – 6:12
"If I Have to Stand Alone" (12" Dub Version) – 4:20
"If I Have to Stand Alone" (7" Version) – 3:25
"If I Have to Stand Alone (Senza Voce)" – 3:16

Charts

References

 

1990 songs
1990 singles
Lonnie Gordon songs
Eurodance songs
Supreme Records singles
Songs written by Pete Waterman
Songs written by Matt Aitken
Songs written by Mike Stock (musician)
Black-and-white music videos